Havens Hospices is a charity (No:1022119) which runs hospice services in Essex. It is intended to support and provide palliative care to babies, children, young adults and adults. Havens Hospices offers community based support (hospice at home care) to families in Essex and runs two hospice services: Fair Havens Hospice and Little Havens Hospice.

75% of the people who work at Havens Hospices are volunteers.

History

It opened in Westcliff-on-Sea on 13 June 1983 and cared for 25,000 adults across Southend, Rochford, and Castle Point between 1983 and 2018.

Scope of work
Fair Havens provide specialist care for adults, from the age of 19, with life-limiting illnesses.

Little Havens cares for children or young people with life-limiting or life-threatening condition. Little Havens is the only place in Essex totally dedicated to caring for children and young people with life limiting illnesses.

Havens Hospices offer the following care options:
Planned respite care, Emergency end of life care, Symptom Management, Post bereavement care and Emergency Respite (if they are able to accommodate this).

Patrons and ambassadors

Peter Shilton is one of its patrons. Sophie Austin became a patron for Little Havens Hospices during 2018.  Rudolph Walker is also patron for Havens Hospices. Su Harrison (Radio Essex presenter) has been a patron for Havens Hospices for many years, and volunteers with the charity at several events including hosting its virtual quizzes.

New Fair Havens Hospice

In Prittlewell Southend they are building a new Fair Havens Hospice which will have a 16 bed in patient unit, a day hospice, family support, wellbeing and charity administrative spaces because of an increase in the number of patients requiring palliative care in the area.  It will cost £17.2 million.  They have been turning away an average of 11 people every month because there were not sufficient beds.

On Friday February, after 65 weeks construction, the new Fair Havens Hospice was finished and the £17.2 million facility was officially handed over to Chief Executive of Havens Hospices, Steve Smith, marking a new era for hospice care for people in South East Essex.

It took the organisation four years to secure planning permission. Take a 3D virtual Tour of the new facilities.

In 2020, staff at Fair Havens arranged a wedding for a terminally ill patient within 24 hours.

In March 2021, the new Fair Havens Hospice celebrated its first year of opening and welcoming its first patient.

Shops

The Havens Hospices Charity Shops are important for their fundraising, their branches cover a large part of south and mid-Essex.

They opened a charity shop in Basildon, Southernhay, during 2015.

In 2019 Havens Hospices launched a Summer Campaign across the county having collaborated with South Essex College fashion students.

A new charity shop outlet located near its adult hospice Fair Havens was opened in April 2021.

More than 25 years after opening, the Havens Hospices’ Leigh Road shop was given a sustainability focused refurbishment.

Legacy

Daphne Hall, who was one of the founders of Fair Havens Hospice and Little Havens Hospice was awarded an MBE in 1998 for her work.

Fundraising

Notable events for the charity include the Southend Half Marathon, a 13.1 mile route in Southend-on-Sea, Pedal for The J's and the annual Havens to Havens Walk  

The charity has a team representing it at the London Marathon, which raised a total of £200,000 in 2019

In 2020 due to Covid-19 the Hospice organised a range of virtual fundraising events including a Skydive, Family Fun Festival and a Virtual Quiz which raised over £16,000.

Havens Hospices launch Challenge 46, a campaign that runs from Monday 21 June to Sunday 27 June during Children's Hospice Week.  It challenges supporters to complete a fundraising activity based around the number 46. The charity has chosen the number 46 because it costs £46,000 to provide care at Little Havens Hospice, which provides specialist care to children and young people either at the hospice or within the home.

The Virtual Southend Half Marathon in 2021 raised a total of £48,900. Due to the Covid-19 pandemic the charity asked supporters to clock up 13.1 miles anywhere, in one or more runs.

The Southend Half Marathon returned to the City of Southend on 12 June 2022, for the first time since 2019. Nearly 2,000 runners took part.

Art Trails 
Hares About Town, a spectacular public art event in partnership with Wild in Art, hopped its way across Southend on Sea in July 2021 for ten weeks. A total of 30 hare sculptures, each individually designed by an artist and sponsored by a business, formed a free trail of discovery for the community to enjoy. The colourful collection of hares were then auctioned off, raising a total of £225,931. The overall total of money raised through the Hares About Town project was a magnificent £447,000.

After the success of Hares About Town in 2021, Havens Hospices announced that they would be partnering with Wild in Art for a second art trail in the Summer 2023. The art trail will see more than 30 large elephant sculptures placed around the city of Southend on Sea, before they are sold at auction, once again raising money for the charity.

External links

References

Hospices in England
Charities based in Essex